Nyan Win (20 November 1942 – 20 July 2021) was a Burmese politician and Aung San Suu Kyi's personal attorney. Nyan Win served on the National League for Democracy's Central Executive Committee and was a party spokesman. He also served as a legal advisor to the NLD.

Career 
Nyan Win was born in Kyaikkami, Mon State on 20 November 1942 to parents Chin Pe and Daw Yi. After graduating with an LLB from Rangoon University, he served as a High Court advocate from 1970-1973, and worked as a government prosecutor until his retirement in November 1988.

Nyan Win won the seat in the Pyithu Hluttaw to represent the Paung Township Constituency No. 1 in the 1990 Burmese general election, winning about 55% of the votes (20,032 valid votes).

Arrest and death 
In the wake of the 2021 Myanmar coup d'état on 1 February, Nyan Win was detained by the Myanmar Armed Forces.  He was accused of "inciting public disorder" and kept in the Insein Prison, where he contracted COVID-19.  Nyan Win was transferred to Yangon General Hospital in mid-July after his condition worsened, but died within a week on 20 July 2021, at the age of 78.

References

1942 births
2021 deaths
People from Mon State
University of Yangon alumni
20th-century Burmese lawyers
Burmese people who died in prison custody
National League for Democracy politicians
Prisoners who died in Burmese detention
Prisoners who died from COVID-19
Deaths from the COVID-19 pandemic in Myanmar